KPEL-FM (96.5 FM, "NewsTalk 96.5 KPEL") is a radio station licensed to the community of Breaux Bridge, Louisiana, and serving the Lafayette, Louisiana area.  The station is owned by Townsquare Media and licensed to Townsquare Media of Lafayette, LLC. It airs a news/talk format.  Its studios are located on Bertrand Road in Lafayette, and its transmitter is located in Abbeville, Louisiana.

The station is led by Brand Manager Rob Kirkpatrick who also manages KROF-AM (960 AM, "TalkRadio960"). The show's line-up consists of local and nationally syndicated content. The local shows include "Acadiana's Morning News" with Rob Kirkpatrick and Bernadette Lee, "The Moon Griffon Show", "The Ross Report" with Carol Ross and "OFFSIDES" with Brandon Comeaux and Shannon Wilkerson. Tiffiany Decou hosts the lifestyle show "The Lafayette Food Junkie" on Sunday evenings at 6. Rush Limbaugh is the lone syndicated show on KPEL's daytime schedule. The station also broadcasts all Louisiana Ragin' Cajuns baseball games.

The station switched frequencies to 96.5 FM effective June 25, 2010.

Notable On-Air Personalities 
Ron Gomez, former broadcaster and state legislature, is the former owner of KPEL-FM. He bought the station along with two others in 1965. In 2019, Gomez was inducted into the Louisiana Political Hall of Fame.

Programming
The station has a talk radio format.  The show's line-up consists of local and nationally syndicated content. The local weekday shows include "Acadiana's Morning News" with Rob Kirkpatrick and Bernadette Lee, "The Moon Griffon Show", "The Ross Report" with Carol Ross and "OFFSIDES" with Brandon Comeaux and Shannon Wilkerson. Tiffiany Decou hosts the lifestyle show "The Lafayette Food Junkie" on Sunday evenings at 6. Rush Limbaugh is the lone syndicated show on KPEL's daytime schedule. Other notable shows include "The Mark Levin Show", "The Todd Starnes Show", "The Kim Komando Show" and "Bobby Likis Car Clinic".

References

External links
KPEL-FM official website

Radio stations in Louisiana
News and talk radio stations in the United States
Vermilion Parish, Louisiana
Townsquare Media radio stations